The 2010 World Aesthetic Gymnastics Championships, the 11th edition of the Aesthetic group gymnastics competition, was held in Varna, Bulgaria from June 10 to 12, at the Palace of Culture and Sports.

Participating nations

Medal winners

Results

Senior
The top 10 teams (2 per country) and the host country in Preliminaries qualify to the Finals.

References

External links
http://www.ifagg.com/competition/new-results/ 
https://ifagg.sporttisaitti.com/

World Aesthetic Gymnastics Championships
International gymnastics competitions hosted by Bulgaria 
2010 in gymnastics
Sport in Varna, Bulgaria